Sudhir Srivastava is chief of the Cancer Biomarkers Research Group of the Division of Cancer Prevention at the United States NCI. Srivastava has held this position since 2000. He is a co-author of the Bethesda Guidelines for the diagnosis of Hereditary non-polyposis colorectal cancer (HNPCC).

Srivastava is an elected member of the American Joint Committee on Cancer (AJCC), responsible for developing cancer staging criteria, and serves on the AJCC Executive Committee and the All Ireland-NCI Consortium. Srivastava is a founding member of HUPO, participated in the Plasma Proteome and the Liver Proteome Projects, and supported several HUPO-supported initiatives. He is the principal architect of the NCI's Early Detection Research Network. He has received several NIH and NCI honors and awards and has initiated and chaired workshops and conferences. He organized a Gordon Research Conference on New Frontiers in Cancer Detection and Diagnosis in 2002, which was continued for several years afterward. In 2003, he was featured in Wired magazine. Srivastava has published more than 170 peer-reviewed papers and edited four books. He is editor-in-chief of the journal Disease Biomarkers and co-founded Cancer Biomarkers.

Srivastava received his PhD degree in biological science from Banaras Hindu University in 1977, followed by an MS in Computer Science from the Virginia Commonwealth University in 1987 and a MPH degree from the Johns Hopkins University in 1997. He did postdoctoral work at the University of Osaka, Japan, the University of California, San Francisco and the University of Arizona, Tucson.

References

Living people
American medical researchers
Banaras Hindu University alumni
Virginia Commonwealth University alumni
Johns Hopkins University alumni
University of California, San Francisco faculty
University of Arizona faculty
Cancer researchers
1954 births